Robert P. Grant (November 28, 1948 – December 9, 2015) was a Democratic member of the Kansas House of Representatives, representing the 2nd district. He served his first term from 1991 to 1994 and served from 1997 to 2013.

Prior to becoming a representative, Grant served as mayor of Cherokee for 16 years. Long active in the community, he was involved with the American Legion, West Mineral Eagles and Pittsburg Elks Lodge #412 and with Big Brothers/Big Sisters and the Cherokee Gun Club.

Grant was married to his wife Lynn for 39 years.  They have a daughter and two grandchildren.

He announced he would be retiring effective December 10, 2013. Grant died on December 9, 2015, at the age of 67 after a short illness.

Committee membership
 Financial Institutions (Ranking Member)
 Insurance (Ranking Member)
 Transportation
 Agriculture and Natural Resources
 Joint Committee on State Building Construction (Chair)

Major donors
The top five donors to Grant's 2008 campaign came mostly from professional associations:
1. Midwest Minerals $1,000
2. Kansas National Education Assoc. $1,000
3. Kansans for Lifesaving Cures $1,000
4. Kansas Optometric Assoc. $800
5. Kansas Bankers Assoc. $800

References

External links
 Project Vote Smart profile
 Kansas Votes profile
 State Surge - Legislative and voting track record
 Follow the Money campaign contributions:
 2000,2002, 2004, 2006, 2008
 Kansas Democrats Biography
 Ballotpedia

Mayors of places in Kansas
Democratic Party members of the Kansas House of Representatives
1948 births
2015 deaths
People from Cherokee, Kansas
People from Clovis, New Mexico